Oreochromis squamipinnis is a critically endangered species of cichlid fish that is endemic to Lake Malawi,  Lake Malombe and Shire River in East Africa, where found in a wide range of habitats, but especially in shallow water. This species is important to local commercial fisheries and can also be found in the aquarium trade, but it has declined drastically due to overfishing.

Females and immatures resemble O. karongae and O. lidole, but mature males have pale upper heads unlike mature males of those species.

It is part of the subgenus Nyasalapia, which are known as chambo. During breeding, the female attempts to pick them up with her mouth and this helps the male in fertilizing the female's eggs, already in her mouth. It mainly feeds on phytoplankton, but also eats zooplankton and detritus.

The lepidophagous cichlid Corematodus shiranus is an aggressive mimic of chambo in both color pattern and swimming mode. It is, therefore, able to approach unsuspecting schools of O. squamipinnis and rapidly take a mouthful of scales or fin.

References

squamipinnis
Fish of Lake Malawi
Taxonomy articles created by Polbot
Fish described in 1864
Taxa named by Albert Günther